George McKenzie (died in 2006) was a Republic of Ireland soccer international.

McKenzie was a goalkeeper and was capped 9 times for the Republic of Ireland at senior level.

References

External links
 Profile from soccerscene.ie

Republic of Ireland association footballers
Republic of Ireland international footballers
Plymouth Argyle F.C. players
Southend United F.C. players
Hereford United F.C. players
Year of birth missing
2006 deaths
Association football goalkeepers